Peter Albert Palangio (September 10, 1908 – December 24, 2004) was a Canadian ice hockey player who played 70 games in the National Hockey League with the Montreal Canadiens, Detroit Cougars and Chicago Black Hawks between 1926 and 1938. Born in North Bay, Ontario, he won the Stanley Cup in 1938 with Chicago as number 18. He died December 24, 2004, in North Bay, Ontario. He was the last surviving member of Black Hawks 1938 Stanley Cup team. And the oldest living Montreal Canadiens.

Regular season and playoffs

External links

1908 births
2004 deaths
Canadian expatriate ice hockey players in the United States
Canadian ice hockey left wingers
Canadian people of Italian descent
Chicago Blackhawks players
Dallas Texans (AHA) players
Detroit Cougars players
Hershey Bears players
Ice hockey people from Ontario
Kitchener Flying Dutchmen players
London Panthers players
London Tecumsehs players
Montreal Canadiens players
Pittsburgh Hornets players
Sportspeople from North Bay, Ontario
Stanley Cup champions
St. Louis Flyers (AHA) players
Syracuse Stars (IHL) players
Tulsa Oilers (AHA) players
Windsor Bulldogs (CPHL) players